Ardcroney, officially Ardcrony is a village and townland in County Tipperary, Ireland,  north of Nenagh. It also forms a civil parish in the historical barony of Ormond Lower. It is halfway between Nenagh and Borrisokane on the N52 road.

Buildings of note
Ardcroney church is a T-plan gable-fronted church, built in 1838. Along with a later (c.1975) detached round bell tower with conical slate roof, it is listed as a protected structure by Tipperary County Council (RPS Ref S583). The local Church of Ireland church was moved to Bunratty folk park where it was unveiled in 1998.
Ardcroney Burial Mound is located about 2 km east of Ardcroney; It is listed as a national monument and is in state care.

Sport
The local junior soccer club, Ardcroney FC, was formed in 1982.

See also
List of civil parishes of Tipperary
List of towns and villages in the Republic of Ireland

References

Towns and villages in County Tipperary
Townlands of County Tipperary
Civil parishes of Ormond Lower